The American Medical Association (AMA) is a professional association and lobbying group of physicians and medical students.  Founded in 1847, it is headquartered in Chicago, Illinois.  Membership was 271,660 in 2022.

The AMA's stated mission is "to promote the art and science of medicine and the betterment of public health." The Association also publishes the Journal of the American Medical Association (JAMA). The AMA also publishes a list of Physician Specialty Codes which are the standard method in the U.S. for identifying physician and practice specialties.

The American Medical Association is governed by a House of Delegates as well as a board of trustees in addition to executive management. The organization maintains the AMA Code of Medical Ethics, and the AMA Physician Masterfile containing data on United States Physicians. The Current Procedural Terminology coding system was first published in 1966 and is maintained by the Association. It has also published works such as the Guides to Evaluation of Permanent Impairment and established the American Medical Association Foundation and the American Medical Political Action Committee.

Susan R. Bailey, the third consecutive female president of the AMA and an allergist and immunologist from Fort Worth, Texas, was sworn in as president in June 2020. The current president is Jack Resneck Jr., a dermatologist from San Rafael, California.

History

1847–1900
In 1846, the organization created a committee dedicated to analyzing the methodology of vital records registration. It urged state governments to adopt measures to register births, marriages and deaths within their populations. In 1847, the American Medical Association was founded in Philadelphia by Nathan Smith Davis as a national professional medical organization. The AMA established the world's first national code for ethical medical practice, the AMA Code of Medical Ethics. The organization educated people about the dangers of patent medicines and called for legislation regulating their production and sale. One resulting legislation was the Drug Importation Act of 1848.

In 1848, the AMA began publishing Transactions of the American Medical Association, which included lists and reports of cases of physiological effects of ether and chloroform at the Massachusetts General Hospital in Boston, the New York Hospital and the clinics of the University of Pennsylvania and Jefferson Medical College.

At the organization's second meeting in 1849, Thomas Wood suggested a committee on medical science to establish a board to analyze quack remedies and nostrums to be published in order to inform the public about the dangers of such remedies. The AMA's attempts to expose quack remedies aided the passage of the first Pure Food and Drug Act in 1906.

The AMA Committee on Ethics advocated for recognition of qualified female physicians in 1869, and the AMA inducted its first female member, Sarah Hackett Stevenson, as an Illinois State Medical Society delegate in 1876.

In 1872, the AMA's book Nomenclature of Diseases was published.

The Journal of the American Medical Association was launched in 1883. The organization's founder, Nathan Smith Davis, served as the first editor of the publication.

In 1897, the AMA was incorporated in the state of Illinois.

AMA pushed for laws requiring compulsory smallpox vaccinations in 1899. In 1899, the AMA appointed a committee to report on tuberculosis, including on its communicability and prevention. The Committee on Tuberculosis presented its report in October 1900.

1901–1920
In 1901, the AMA was reorganized with its central authority shifted to a House of Delegates, a board of trustees, and executive offices. The House of Delegates was modeled after the United States House of Representatives and included representatives from medical organizations across the United States as a formal, reform-minded legislative body. The organization's new president appointed a Committee on Medical Education in order to evaluate medical education in the United States and make recommendations for its improvement.

The AMA's Committee on National Legislation established the Committee on Medical Legislation in 1901.

AMA created the Council on Pharmacy and Chemistry in 1905 to set standards for drug manufacturing and advertising. That same year, the AMA began a voluntary program of drug approval, which would remain in effect until 1955. Drug companies were required to show proof of the effectiveness of their drugs to advertise them in AMA's journal.

In 1906, the AMA established a Physician Masterfile designed to contain data on physicians in the United States as well as graduates of American medical schools and international graduates who are in the United States. Each file is established when an individual either enters medical schools or enters the United States.

The AMA established the Council for the Defense of Medical Research in 1908.

AMA's Council on Medical Education and Hospitals first published its annual list of hospitals approved for internships in 1914.

The AMA established a policy of opposition to compulsory health insurance by state or federal government in 1920.

1921–1960
In May 1922, the Woman's Auxiliary to the AMA was organized. The following year, the AMA established standards for medical specialty training residency programs. The AMA later published its first list of hospitals approved for residency training in 1927.

In 1927, Congress passed the Caustic Poison Act, lobbied for by the AMA, which required product labels to include warnings if they included lye or 10 other caustic chemicals.

In 1933, the AMA's general medical guide the Standard Classified Nomenclature of Disease, (referred to as the Standard), was released. Along with the New York Academy of Medicine, the APA provided the psychiatric nomenclature subsection. A number of revisions were produced, with the last in 1961.

The Normal Diet, a comprehensive listing of what Americans should be eating, was published by the AMA in 1938.

A formal partnership between the AMA and the Association of American Medical Colleges formed the Liaison Committee on Medical Education in 1942 in order to establish requirements for certification of medical schools. In 1951, the Joint Commission on Accreditation of Hospitals was created through merging the Hospital Standardization Program with quality standards from the American College of Physicians, the American Hospital Association, and the American Medical Association. The commission, established for evaluation and accreditation of healthcare organizations in the United States, governed by a board of commissioners including physicians, consumers and administrators.

The AMA publicly endorsed the principle of fluoridation of community water supplies in 1951.

The Physicians Advisory Committee on Television, Radio and Motion Pictures was established by the AMA in 1955 in order to maintain medical accuracy in media.

The AMA's Committee on Alcoholism issued a statement in 1956 calling alcoholism an illness and encouraging medical personnel and institutions to admit and treat alcoholic patients.

1961–1980
In 1961, the AMA opposed the King-Anderson bill proposing Medicare legislation and took out advertisements in newspapers, radio and television against government health insurance. The AMA established the American Medical Political Action Committee, which was separate from AMA though the Association nominated its board of directors. The AMA's efforts to defeat Medicare legislation was called Operation Coffee Cup and included secretive meetings in which the vinyl LP "Ronald Reagan Speaks Out Against Socialized Medicine" was played. The AMA created an "Eldercare" proposal rather than hospital insurance through Social Security.

The AMA first published the Current Procedural Terminology (CPT) coding system in 1966. The system was created for uniform reporting of outpatient physician services. The first manual was 163 pages and contained only four-digit codes with descriptions of each. A second edition of the book was published in 1970 with a fifth digit added.

In 1969, AMA proposed the Medicredit program. The program was created to be flexible so that all people had an option for health insurance.

The AMA published the first Guides to the Evaluation of Permanent Impairment in 1971. The guides were later republished in 1977 before the AMA Council on Scientific Affairs created 12 committees to review the guides before the second edition was published in 1984.

In the 1970s, the AMA spoke out against gender discrimination in medical institutions.

In 1972, the AMA launched a "war on smoking" and supported legislation that would prohibit tobacco sample disbursement.

The following year, in 1973, the AMA urged physicians to combat hypertension through a national program.

In 1975, the AMA adopted a policy stating that "discrimination based on sexual orientation is improper and unacceptable by any part of the federation of medicine." It adopted a resolution to repeal all state sodomy laws.

In 1976, the AMA began encouraging all public facilities to have handicap access.

1981–2000
The AMA released a survey in 1981 that found two short-term effects of dioxin on humans and recommended further studies. By 1983, the AMA accused the news media of conducting a "witch hunt" against the toxic chemical and launched a public information campaign to counter media hysteria.

In the early 1980s, the AMA advocated for raising the national legal drinking age to 21.

The Supreme Court of the United States upheld Federal Trade Commission order that allowed doctors and dentists to advertise without professional associations interfering in 1982. The order restrained the AMA from obstructing agreements between physicians and health maintenance organizations.

In May 1983, the Journal of the American Medical Association published a report that reviewed cases of childhood AIDS.

The AMA called for a ban on advertising and promotion of all tobacco products in any form of media. The AMA also proposed declaring snuff and chewing tobacco a health hazard, increasing the tax on cigarettes, prohibiting smoking on public transportation and urged medical facilities to ban smoking on their premises.

A Federal district judge ruled that the AMA had violated the Sherman Antitrust Act in 1987 by depriving chiropractors of access to the Association. The lawsuit, filed by four chiropractors, accused AMA of conspiring to prevent chiropractors from practicing in the United States.

In 1990, AMA published Health Access America, which proposed improved access to affordable health care for citizens without healthcare insurance.

The Journal of the American Medical Association first documented that Joe Camel cartoons reached more children than adults in December 1991. The Association called for the R. J. Reynolds Tobacco Company to stop using the Joe Camel character in its advertising because of its appeal to youth.

In 1995, Lonnie R. Bristow became the first African-American president of the American Medical Association. Before he became president, Bristow was the first African-American member of the board of trustees and first African-American chairman of the board.

In 1996, the AMA campaigned against health plan "gag clauses", which prohibited doctors from discussing with their patients treatments not covered by the plan, stating that the stipulations inhibit the communication of information and restrict the care doctors can give their patients. The clauses were removed from the contracts of five leading providers, and laws prohibiting such clauses were passed in 16 states.

In 1997, the AMA established the National Patient Safety Foundation as an independent, nonprofit research and education organization focused on patient safety.

In 1997, the AMA lobbied Congress to restrict the number of doctors that could be trained in the United States, claiming that, "The United States is on the verge of a serious oversupply of physicians."

Nancy W. Dickey was named president of the American Medical Association in June 1998. She was the first woman to head the organization and had been part of AMA's leadership since 1977.

2000–present
In 2002, the American Medical Association released a report that found a medical liability insurance crisis in at least a dozen states was forcing physicians to either close practices or limit services. The association called for Congress to take action and campaigned for national reform.

The American Medical Association launched the "Voice for the Uninsured" campaign in 2007 to promote coverage for uninsured citizens.

In 2007, AMA called for state and federal agencies to investigate potential conflicts of interest between the retail clinics and pharmacy chains.

The American Medical Association issued a formal apology for previous policies that excluded African-Americans from the organization and announced increased efforts to increase minority physician participation in the AMA in 2008.

In 2009, the American Medical Association released a public letter to the United States Congress and President Barack Obama endorsing his proposed overhaul to the public health care system, including universal health coverage. The following year, it offered "qualified support" for the Patient Protection and Affordable Care Act.

The AMA officially recognized obesity as a disease in 2013 in an attempt to change how the medical community approaches the issue. In 2014, the Association created the AMA Opioid Task Force to evaluate prescription opioid use and abuse. The American Medical Association supported the Medicare Access and CHIP Reauthorization Act of 2015, which introduced Medicare reforms and replaced the SGR formula with increased Medicare physician reimbursement.

In 2015, the AMA declared there is no medically valid reason to exclude transgender individuals from serving in the U.S. military. The Human Rights Campaign lauded the decision.

The Association announced its opposition to replacing the federal health care law in March 2017, claiming millions of Americans would lose health care coverage.

Patrice A. Harris, MD, MA, a psychiatrist from Atlanta, became the AMA's 174th president in June 2019, the organization's first African-American woman to hold this position.

Policy positions
The AMA has one of the largest political lobbying budgets of any organization in the United States. Its political positions throughout its history have often been controversial. In the 1930s, the AMA attempted to prohibit its members from working for the health maintenance organizations established during the Great Depression, which violated the Sherman Antitrust Act and resulted in a conviction ultimately affirmed by the US Supreme Court. In the 1940s, the AMA opposed President Truman's proposed healthcare reforms, which would have expanded healthcare facilities in low-income and rural communities, bolstered public health services, increased investments in medical research and education, and provided a national health insurance plan to help relieve the burden of excessive healthcare bills from sick persons. The AMA condemned Truman's plan as "socialized medicine."

The American Medical Association's vehement campaign against Medicare in the 1950s and 1960s included Operation Coffee Cup, supported by Ronald Reagan. Since the enactment of Medicare, the AMA reversed its position and now opposes any "cut to Medicare funding or shift [of] increased costs to beneficiaries at the expense of the quality or accessibility of care". However, the AMA remains opposed to any single-payer health care plan, such as the Medicare for All Act. In the 1990s, the organization was part of the coalition that defeated the health care reform advanced by Hillary and Bill Clinton.

The AMA has also supported changes in medical malpractice law to limit damage awards, which, it contends, makes it difficult for patients to find appropriate medical care. In many states, high risk specialists have moved to other states that have enacted reform. For example, in 2004, all neurosurgeons had relocated out of the entire southern half of Illinois. The main legislative emphasis in multiple states has been to effect caps on the amount that patients can receive for pain and suffering. These costs for pain and suffering are only those that exceed the actual costs of healthcare and lost income. At the same time however, states without caps also experienced similar results, suggesting that other market factors may have contributed to the decreases. Some economic studies have found that caps have historically had an uncertain effect on premium rates. A recent report by the AMA found that, in a 12-month period, five percent of physicians had claims filed against them.

The AMA sponsors the Specialty Society Relative Value Scale Update Committee, which is an influential group of 29 physicians, mostly specialists, who help determine the value of different physicians' labor in Medicare prices.

Lobbying 
Between 1998 and 2020, the association has spent an average of $18 million annually on lobbying efforts. In the first quarter of 2021, they reported $6.36 million in lobbying expenses.

Position on racism
In 2021, the AMA published a plan to dismantle "structural racism" which would encourage "explicit conversations about power, racism, gender and class oppression, forms of discrimination and exclusion", based on critical race theory and the antiracism movement.

Political donations 
The association has donated between $1.6 million and $3.4 million in election cycles between 1990 and 2020. Their distributions have varied from near parity for both Democrats and Republicans to heavily favoring Republican candidates at 75% in the 1996 and 2004 elections.

Between 1990 and 2020, the majority of contributions came from PAC money.

Criticism
During the Civil Rights Movement, the American Medical Association's policy of allowing its constituent groups to be racially segregated in areas with widespread prejudice faced opposition from doctors as well as other healthcare professionals. Pressure from organizations such as the Medical Committee for Human Rights (MCHR) resulted in changed policies by the late 1960s.

Nobel Memorial Prize-winning economist Milton Friedman as well as his wife, Rose Friedman, have claimed that the organization acts as a guild and has attempted to increase physicians' wages and fees by influencing limitations on the supply of physicians and competition from non-physicians. In the book Free to Choose, the Friedmans stated that "the AMA has engaged in extensive litigation charging chiropractors and osteopathic physicians with the unlicensed practice of medicine, in an attempt to restrict them to as narrow an area as possible." The AMA was also criticized for holding up licensing of foreign-trained medical professionals after Adolf Hitler came to power, who were fleeing to the U.S. from Nazi-controlled Germany and adjacent nations. Profession and Monopoly also criticized the AMA for limiting the supply of physicians and inflating the cost of medical care in the U.S as well as its influence on hospital regulation. In a 1987 antitrust court case, a federal district judge called the AMA's behavior toward chiropractors "systematic, long-term wrongdoing". The AMA was accused of limiting the associations between physicians and chiropractors. In the 1960s and 1970s, the association's Committee on Quackery was said to have targeted the chiropractic profession, and for many years the AMA held that it was unethical for physicians to refer patients to chiropractors or to receive referrals from chiropractors.

In October 2020, the association used Twitter and Facebook to publicly oppose scope of practice creep, where non-physicians are permitted to provide healthcare services without physician oversight. The posts were removed the same day and the AMA commented that they were committed to "team-based healthcare guided by a physician" to "optimize patient outcomes." The American Academy of Physician Assistants published a letter expressing their frustration at the social media posts. Rebekah Bernard from the conservative advocacy group Physicians for Patient Protection publicly criticized the AMA for retracting their social media posts.

Structure
The AMA is composed of policy discussion groups that meet twice a year for an annual meeting and an Interim meeting. Within the AMA, there are sections that include Medical Students, Resident and Fellows, Academic physicians, Medical School Deans and Faculty, Physicians in group practice setting, Retired and Senior Physicians, International Medical graduates, Woman physicians, Physician Diversity and Minority health, GLBT, USAN, AMA board of Trustees, Foundation and Council. External organizations, called AMA member organizations, come to these meetings by sending representatives. Representatives come from a state, specialty or the federal services/government service medical societies.

See also
 AMA Foundation Leadership Award
 AMA Manual of Style
 AMA Scientific Achievement Award
 American Association of Physicians and Surgeons
 American Dental Association
 American Medical Student Association
 American Osteopathic Association
 George H. Simmons
 JAMA Pediatrics
 List of journals published by the American Medical Association
 National Physicians Alliance
 Physicians for a National Health Program
 C. A. L. Reed

References

External links

 

 
Organizations established in 1847
Medical and health professional associations in Chicago
1847 establishments in Pennsylvania
Medical associations based in the United States
Professional associations based in the United States
501(c)(6) nonprofit organizations
Lobbying organizations in the United States